In the nation of Myanmar (Burma), certain customs are associated with the institution of marriage.

Selecting a partner
Most Burmese people find their own life partner, but sometimes they may have an arranged marriage conducted by their parents or a middleman. If the parents do not support the couple, they may get married in secret then after some time the parents might accept their marriage. Traditionally, when a man goes to ask a woman's parents to bless their marriage, he brings a gift to his future wife.

There are many superstitions regarding marriage in Myanmar. Tradition holds that those born on particular combinations of days of the week are not right for each other. For example: those born on Saturday would not be suitable for those born on Thursday. Likewise, Friday and Monday, Sunday and Wednesday, and Wednesday evening and Tuesday are all poor matches. If the couple is poorly matched, they will go to an astrologer and ask for help to avoid future difficulties. Astrologers also advise on the date and time of the ceremony, and the color of the wedding dress.

Polygyny is illegal in Myanmar.

Preparation
The first step to a proper engagement is for the bride and groom's parents and chosen elders to be formally and publicly introduced at the bride's home or a public venue. During that time, both sides will discuss the details of the wedding. However close they are, the families will formally negotiate about the wedding.

During the engagement celebration, the groom's family offers coconut, banana, and pickled tea leaves on a tray to the bride's family home for the household nat (spirit).

Wedding

Historically, marriages could be announced to the public by letting people from seven houses on either side of the wedded couple's house know about it. Nowadays, people prefer to celebrate their wedding ceremony impressively among their community. Some couples sign the marriage certificate at a courthouse and some invite a judge to their home. Generally, monks are invited to home in rural areas. In metropolitan areas, families go monasteries. The couple offers food to the monks and listen to a sermon.
 
The best months to celebrate the wedding ceremony are April, May, June, October, November, and February. If a couple marries during these months, tradition holds that they will have a prosperous and long-lasting relationship. Couples try to avoid marrying during Buddhist Lent, from July to September.

The married state
After marriage, a couple may live with their in-laws for a short time or for a lifetime. Household chores are carried out by women.

Husbands are traditionally “rice winners”; however, wives manage the family income. Sometimes wives supplement their husband's income by running a house-store, dress-making or selling something.  When a Burmese woman marries, she does not need to transfer her property to her husband.

Divorce and death
According to the United Nations Population Fund, divorce rates in Myanmar are low: 3 per cent of women and 2 per cent of men are divorced or separated. If a married woman divorces, she can keep what she has brought to the marriage. When a husband dies, everything he owns goes to his wife. Only after she dies does the property go to the children.

References

Bibliography

Myanmar
Burmese culture
Myanmar